Tangut is an extinct language in the Sino-Tibetan language family.

Tangut was one of the official languages of the Western Xia dynasty, founded by the Tangut people in northwestern China. The Western Xia was annihilated by the Mongol Empire in 1227. The Tangut language has its own script, the Tangut script. The latest known text written in the Tangut language, the Tangut dharani pillars, dates to 1502, suggesting that the language was still in use nearly three hundred years after the collapse of Western Xia.

Classification
Since the 2010s, more Tangutologists have classified Tangut as a Qiangic and/or Gyalrongic language. On the basis of both morphological and lexical evidence, Lai et al. (2020) classify Tangut as a West Gyalrongic language.

Rediscovery
Modern research into the Tangut languages began in the late 19th century and early 20th century when S. W. Bushell, Gabriel Devéria, and Georges Morisse separately published decipherments of a number of Tangut characters found on Western Xia coins, in a Chinese–Tangut bilingual inscription on a stele at Wuwei, Gansu, and in a copy of the Tangut translation of the Lotus Sutra.

The majority of extant Tangut texts were excavated at Khara-Khoto in 1909 by Pyotr Kozlov, and the script was identified as that of the Tangut state of Xixia. Such scholars as Aleksei Ivanovich Ivanov, Ishihama Juntaro, Berthold Laufer, Luo Fuchang, Luo Fucheng, and Wang Jingru have contributed to research on the Tangut language. The most significant contribution was made by the Russian scholar Nikolai Aleksandrovich Nevsky (1892–1937), who compiled the first Tangut dictionary and reconstructed the meaning of a number of Tangut grammatical particles, thus making it possible to actually read and understand Tangut texts. His scholarly achievements were published posthumously in 1960 under the title Tangutskaya Filologiya (Tangut Philology), and the scholar was eventually (and posthumously) awarded the Soviet Lenin Prize for his work. The understanding of the Tangut language is far from perfect: although certain aspects of the morphology (Ksenia Kepping, The Morphology of the Tangut Language, Moscow: Nauka, 1985) and grammar (Tatsuo Nishida, Seika go no kenkyū, etc.) are understood, the syntactic structure of Tangut remains largely unexplored.

The Khara-Khoto documents are at present preserved in the Institute of Oriental Manuscripts of the Russian Academy of Sciences in Saint Petersburg. These survived the Siege of Leningrad, but a number of manuscripts in the possession of Nevsky at the time of his arrest by the People's Commissariat for Internal Affairs (NKVD) in 1937 went missing, and were returned, under mysterious circumstances, to the Institute of Oriental Manuscripts only in October 1991. The collections amount to about 10,000 volumes, of mostly Buddhist texts, law codes and legal documents dating from mid-11th up to early 13th centuries. Among the Buddhist texts a number of unique compilations, not known either in Chinese or in Tibetan versions, were recently discovered. Furthermore, the Buddhist canon, the Chinese classics, and a great number of indigenous texts written in Tangut have been preserved. These other major Tangut collections, though much smaller in size, belong to the British Library, the French National Library ('Bibliothèque nationale de France'), the National Library in Beijing, the Library of Beijing University and other libraries.

Reconstruction

The connection between the writing and the pronunciation of the Tangut language is even more tenuous than that between Chinese writing and the modern Chinese varieties. Thus although in Chinese more than 90% of the characters possess a phonetic element, this proportion is limited to about 10% in Tangut according to Sofronov. The reconstruction of Tangut pronunciation must resort to other sources.

The discovery of the Pearl in the Palm, a Tangut-Chinese bilingual glossary, permitted Ivanov (1909) and Laufer (1916) to propose initial reconstructions and to undertake the comparative study of Tangut. This glossary in effect indicates the pronunciation of each Tangut character with one or several Chinese characters, and inversely each Chinese character with one or more Tangut characters. The second source is the corpus of Tibetan transcriptions of Tangut. These data were studied for the first time by Nevsky (Nevskij) (1925).

Nonetheless, these two sources were not in themselves sufficient for a systematic reconstruction of Tangut. In effect, these transcriptions were not written with the intention of representing with precision the pronunciation of Tangut, but instead simply to help foreigners to pronounce and memorize the words of one language with the words of another which they could understand.

The third source, which constitutes the basis of the modern reconstructions, consists of monolingual Tangut dictionaries: the Wenhai, two editions of the Tongyin, the Wenhai zalei and an untitled dictionary. The record of the pronunciation in these dictionaries is made using the principle of  fǎnqiè, borrowed from the Chinese lexicographic tradition. Although these dictionaries may differ on small details  (e.g. the Tongyin categorizes the characters according to syllable initial and rime without taking any account of tone), they all adopt the same system of 105 rimes. A certain number of rimes are in complementary distribution with respect to the place of articulation of the initials, e.g. rimes 10 and 11 or rimes 36 and 37, which shows that the scholars who composed these dictionaries had made a very precise phonetic analysis of their language.

In distinction to the transcription in foreign languages, the Tangut fanqie makes distinctions among the rhymes in a systematic and very precise manner. Due to the fǎnqiè, we now have a good understanding of the phonological categories of the language. Nonetheless, it is necessary to compare the phonological system of the dictionaries with the other sources in order to "fill in" the categories with a phonetic value.

N. A. Nevsky reconstructed Tangut grammar and provided the first Tangut–Chinese–English–Russian dictionary, which together with the collection of his papers was published posthumously in 1960 under the title Tangut Philology (Moscow: 1960). Marc Miyake has published on Tangut phonology and diachronics. There are four Tangut dictionaries available: the one composed by N.A. Nevsky, one composed by Nishida (1966), one composed by Li Fanwen (1997, revised edition 2008) and one composed by Yevgeny Kychanov (2006).

There is growing a school of Tangut studies in China. Leading scholars include Shi Jinbo, Li Fanwen, Nie Hongyin, Bai Bin in mainland China, and Gong Hwang-cherng and Lin Ying-chin in Taiwan.

Phonology
The Tangut syllable has a CV structure and carries one of two distinctive tones, flat or rising. Following the tradition of Chinese phonological analysis the Tangut syllable is divided into initial and rhyme (i.e. the remaining syllable minus the initial).

Consonants
The consonants are divided into the following categories:

The rhyme books distinguish 105 rhyme classes, which are, in turn, classified in several ways:/grade, type, and class.

Tangut rhymes occur in three types. They are seen in the tradition of Nishida, followed by both Arakawa and Gong as 'normal', 'tense', and 'retroflex'. Gong leaves normal vowels unmarked and places a dot under tense vowels and an -r after retroflex vowels. Arakawa differs only by indicating tense vowels with a final -q.

The rhyme books distinguish four vowel grades. In early phonetic reconstructions, all four were separately accounted for, but it has since been realized that grades three and four are in complementary distribution, depending on the initial. Consequently, the reconstructions of Arakawa and Gong do not account for this distinction. Gong represents these three grades as V, iV, and jV. Arakawa accounts for them as V, iV, and V.

In general rhyme class corresponds to the set of all rhymes under the same rhyme type which have the same main vowel.

Gong further posits phonemic vowel length and points to evidence that indicates that Tangut had a distinction that Chinese lacked. There is no certainty that the distinction was vowel length and so other researchers have remained skeptical.

Vowels

Miyake reconstructs the vowels differently. In his reconstruction, the 95 vowels of Tangut formed from a six-vowel system in Pre-Tangut because of preinitial loss. (The two vowels in parentheses appeared only in loanwords from Chinese, and many of the vowels in class III were in complementary distribution with their equivalents in class IV.)

The classes here is related to those of Chinese rime tables.

See also
Tosu language
Tangutology
List of Tangutologists
Jurchen language

References

Citations

Sources 

 Beaudouin, Mathieu (2023). Tangut and Horpa languages: some shared morphosyntactic features Language and Linguistics. 24.4.
 Jacques, Guillaume (2009). The origin of vowel alternations in the Tangut verb Language and Linguistics. 10.1:17–27.
 Jacques, Guillaume (2011). The structure of the Tangut verb Journal of Chinese Linguistics. 39.2:419–441.

External links

 James Matisoff, 2004. "Brightening" and the place of Xixia (Tangut) in the Qiangic subgroup of Tibeto-Burman
Ксения Кепинг. Последние статьи и документы. (Ksenia Kepping. Last Works and Documents.) 
西夏に関するページ 
Translating Chinese Tradition and Teaching Tangut Culture An open access monograph by Imre Galambos about Tangut translations of Chinese literary texts. First chapters of the work contain a detailed account on the discovery of Tangut material and the history of Tangutology
Downes Alan How does Tangut work? PhD thesis, Macquarie University 2018

Languages of China
Medieval languages
Qiangic languages
Tanguts
Unclassified Sino-Tibetan languages
Extinct languages of Asia
Languages attested from the 11th century
Languages extinct in the 16th century